Warabi, Saitama held a mayoral election on June 3, 2007. Hideo Yoritaka, an independent backed by the Japanese Communist Party (JCP) won.

Candidates 

 Hideo Yoritaka, member of the Japanese Communist Party and former city assembly member.
 Shono Takuya, Mayor of Warabi from 2003 to 2007, supported by conservative Liberal Democratic Party (LDP) and Komeito.

The Democratic Party of Japan, the second largest party in Japan, did not support any of the candidates.

Results

References 
 Results from JanJan 
 Japan Press coverage

Warabi, Saitama
2007 elections in Japan
Mayoral elections in Japan
June 2007 events in Japan